Norris Farm–Maxinkuckee Orchard is a historic home and farm located in Union Township, Marshall County, Indiana.  The farmhouse was built in 1855, and is a two-story, vernacular Greek Revival style frame I-house with a one-story rear ell.  It sits on a fieldstone foundation and is sheathed in clapboard.  Also on the property are the contributing garage & milk house annex (c. 1915 & c. 1925), English barn (c. 1905/c.1925), bull shed (c. 1925), apple storage barn (1935, 1955), pasture and orchard fencing (c. 1925), and sundial (c. 1910).

It was listed on the National Register of Historic Places in 2016.

References

Farms on the National Register of Historic Places in Indiana
Greek Revival houses in Indiana
Houses completed in 1855
Buildings and structures in Marshall County, Indiana
National Register of Historic Places in Marshall County, Indiana